Events from the year 1996 in Ireland.

Incumbents
 President: Mary Robinson
 Taoiseach: John Bruton (FG)
 Tánaiste: Dick Spring (Lab)
 Minister for Finance: Ruairi Quinn (Lab)
 Chief Justice: Liam Hamilton
 Dáil: 27th
 Seanad: 20th

Events

 24 January – The international body proposed six principles of democracy and non-violence ('the Mitchell principles') as conditions for entry to all-party talks in Northern Ireland.
 5 February – The Football Association of Ireland appointed Mick McCarthy as manager of the Irish football team.
 9 February – A large Provisional Irish Republican Army (PIRA) bomb exploded in the London Docklands area, near Canary Wharf, injuring around forty, and marking the end of a 17-month IRA ceasefire.
 11 March – The Hepatitis Tribunal opened in Dublin.
 26 April – The fifth People In Need Telethon was held. 
 7 June – Detective Garda Jerry McCabe was shot dead by the PIRA in Adare, County Limerick.
 17 June – The Fifteenth Amendment of the Constitution of Ireland was signed into law, repealing the absolute constitutional prohibition of divorce.
 26 June – Crime reporter Veronica Guerin was shot dead in her car in Dublin.
 4 August – The Proceeds of Crime Act, 1996 was signed into law providing for the seizure of the suspected proceeds of organised criminal activity.
 11 September – A new £100 note depicting Charles Stewart Parnell was issued, with a red-and-brown front and a green-and-yellow back, to replace the 68-year-old £100 note.
 25 September – The last Magdalene asylum closed, in Waterford.
 11 October – The Criminal Assets Bureau Act, 1996 was signed into law providing for the creation of the Criminal Assets Bureau.
 31 October – The new Irish language television station TnaG was launched.
 29 November – It was revealed that Dunnes Stores paid £208,000 for an extension to Minister Michael Lowry's house.
 13 December – On the opening day of a Dublin summit, EU leaders achieved a breakthrough in the argument over preparations for a single European currency.
 23 December – French film-maker Sophie Toscan du Plantier was murdered outside her holiday home in Schull, County Cork.
Undated
 Restaurant Patrick Guilbaud was the first in Dublin to be awarded two Michelin stars.

Arts and literature
 1 February – Martin McDonagh's black comedy The Beauty Queen of Leenane was premiered by the Druid Theatre Company in Galway.
 11 February – The television drama series Ballykissangel first aired. It was made by BBC Northern Ireland and set in a rural Irish community.
 18 May – Ireland won the Eurovision Song Contest for the seventh time with The Voice, sung by Eimear Quinn and composed by Brendan Graham.
 7 August – Marie Jones' play Stones in His Pockets was premiered in Belfast.
 26 September – Enda Walsh's play Disco Pigs was premiered by the Corcadorca Theatre Company at the Triskel Arts Centre in Cork.
 31 October – Ireland's first Irish language television station, Teilifís na Gaeilge (TnaG), was launched. On 3 November the soap opera Ros na Rún was first aired on the channel.
 6 November – The film Michael Collins was shown in Cork and Dublin.
The following novels were published:
 Evening Class by Maeve Binchy.
 Reading in the Dark by Seamus Deane.
 Headbanger by Hugo Hamilton.
 Lucy Sullivan Is Getting Married by Marian Keyes.
 The Story of the Night by Colm Tóibín.

Sport

Association football
 St Patrick's Athletic won the League of Ireland
 Shelbourne won the FAI Cup

Boxing
 9 March – Steve Collins, "The Celtic Warrior", successfully defended his World Boxing Organization super middleweight title against Neville Brown at the Green Glens Arena, Millstreet, County Cork.

Gaelic football
 Meath beat Mayo in the All-Ireland Senior Football Championship final, after a replay, to win their first title since 1988.

Golf
 Murphy's Irish Open was won by Colin Montgomerie (Scotland).

Hurling
 Wexford GAA beat Limerick GAA in the All-Ireland Senior Hurling Championship final.  It was their first senior All-Ireland since 1968.

Olympics
 Swimmer Michelle Smith won three gold medals and one bronze in the Atlanta Olympics.

Births
 3 January – Cian Lynch, hurler (Patrickswell, Limerick)
 24 January – Seán Finn, hurler (Bruff, Limerick)
 26 January – Gary Cully, boxer
 2 February – Paul Mescal, actor
 5 May – Mark McKenna, actor and musician
 29 May – Tom Morrissey, hurler (Ahane, Limerick)
 28 October – Una Raymond-Hoey, cricketer
 16 November – Brendan Murray, singer
 6 December – Ann Skelly, actress
 31 December – Barry Nash, hurler (South Liberties, Limerick)

Deaths

January to June
 8 January – Joyce McCartan, community activist.
 12 February – James Camlin Beckett, historian.
 18 February – Cathal Ó Sándair, writer (born 1922).
 9 March – Ollie Walsh, Kilkenny hurler (born 1937).
 5 April – Gerry L'Estrange, member of the Seanad, Fine Gael TD.
 22 April – Molly Keane, novelist and playwright (born 1904).
 24 April – Tomás de Bhaldraithe, Irish language scholar and lexicographer (born 1916).
 9 June – Patrick Flynn, Liberal Party of Canada MP (born 1921).
 10 June – Peter Raftery, diplomat.
 26 June – Veronica Guerin, journalist, murdered by drug dealers (born 1958).

July to December
 9 July – Christopher Casson, actor (born 1912).
 16 July – Joe Dunn, Jacob's Award-winning documentarian for the Radharc television programme, broadcasting educator, publisher, author (born 1930).
 6 August – Havelock Nelson, composer and pianist (born 1917).
 18 August – Charles Mitchel, actor and television newsreader, read the first Telefís Éireann news bulletin in 1961 (born 1920).
 25 August – Erskine Barton Childers, diplomat writer and broadcaster, son of President Childers (born 1929).
 August – Kathleen Mills, camogie player (born 1923).
 11 November – Liam Naughten, Fine Gael politician, Cathaoirleach of Seanad Éireann from 1995 until his death. (born 1944).
 24 November – Michael O'Hehir, sports commentator and journalist (born 1920).

Full date unknown
 Seán 'ac Dhonncha, traditional singer (born 1919).

See also
1996 in Irish television

References

 
Years of the 20th century in Ireland
Ireland
1990s in Ireland